Wallaceville is a suburb of Upper Hutt (located in the lower (southern) North Island of New Zealand). It is named after John Howard Wallace, an early New Zealand settler, council politician, businessman and author of one of the first published histories of New Zealand.

The suburb is home to the oldest surviving wooden blockhouse in New Zealand, and is served by Wallaceville Railway Station.

History 

The name of Wallaceville was first given to a township of 56 lots of about an acre each in the Mungaroa Valley that J. H. Wallace sold on 15 January 1868. Access to the township, as well as the rest of the Mungaroa and Whitemans Valley was by a road, later known as Wallaceville Road, that has been built between 1864 and 1867 by the Mungaroa Road Board, of which Wallace was also the chairman.

Railway station 
When the railway line reached Upper Hutt in 1876, Wallaceville railway station became a flag station where the line crossed the Wallaceville road (now Ward Street). While the township survived into the early 20th century, it was eventually abandoned and became farmland. However, the name survived and was given to the suburban area developing between the Upper Hutt town centre and the Wallaceville road.

Demographics
 

Wallaceville had a population of 2,388 at the 2018 New Zealand census, an increase of 135 people (6.0%) since the 2013 census, and an increase of 162 people (7.3%) since the 2006 census. There were 990 households. There were 1,149 males and 1,239 females, giving a sex ratio of 0.93 males per female. The median age was 38.2 years (compared with 37.4 years nationally), with 444 people (18.6%) aged under 15 years, 465 (19.5%) aged 15 to 29, 1,137 (47.6%) aged 30 to 64, and 342 (14.3%) aged 65 or older.

Ethnicities were 79.3% European/Pākehā, 16.1% Māori, 6.4% Pacific peoples, 11.9% Asian, and 2.3% other ethnicities (totals add to more than 100% since people could identify with multiple ethnicities).

The proportion of people born overseas was 21.2%, compared with 27.1% nationally.

Although some people objected to giving their religion, 47.7% had no religion, 38.9% were Christian, 1.8% were Hindu, 0.4% were Muslim, 1.5% were Buddhist and 3.1% had other religions.

Of those at least 15 years old, 351 (18.1%) people had a bachelor or higher degree, and 375 (19.3%) people had no formal qualifications. The median income was $33,900, compared with $31,800 nationally. The employment status of those at least 15 was that 1,023 (52.6%) people were employed full-time, 258 (13.3%) were part-time, and 75 (3.9%) were unemployed.

Places

Quinn's Post 

A public house that stood at the corner of what is now Fergusson Drive and Ward Street had a variety of names, including Highland Home, Railway Hotel, and Trentham Hotel before being named Quinn's Post by licensee Richard Quinn, as a tribute to the heroism of the ANZACs at Gallipoli, as recounted by his brother in a letter home from the front line. When a petrol station was built on the corner, and a tavern built next door, both retained the name Quinn's Post.

Wallaceville Animal Research Centre 

The Wallaceville Animal Research Centre was a Government-owned veterinary and animal research centre established at Ward Street, Upper Hutt, New Zealand.  It represented over one hundred years of government-initiated agricultural research.

Establishment 

In 1892 the New Zealand Government formed the Department of Agriculture. Part of the new department's work was to undertake research on livestock which could then be applied to help the farming community. Initial laboratory research was carried out in makeshift accommodation in Wellington. In 1904 the land at Wallaceville was acquired and a small research laboratory, known as the Wallaceville Laboratory, was opened in June 1905.

New Zealand's first, and at the time only, Government Veterinary Surgeon was John Gilruth.  Born in Scotland, Gilruth had been recruited by the New Zealand Government to take charge of the Veterinary Division of the then recently formed Department of Agriculture.  Having qualified as a Veterinary Surgeon at the age of 21 and aged only 23 at the time of his appointment, Gilruth had added several years to his age, apparently in case the recruiters disapproved of his youth.

The Wallaceville Veterinary Laboratory was established on a 100-acre (or 130-acre) block of land that was swampy and required clearing.  The original, "1905 Laboratory" still exists as a Historic Place Category 1.

Development

It took some time for suitable laboratory buildings and staff accommodation to be constructed. However over the next 70 years the site and staff numbers continued to grow and by the late 1970s over 200 staff were employed at Wallaceville carrying out world-leading research and testing.  AgResearch had until mid 2014 its National Centre for Biosecurity and Infectious Diseases at Wallaceville.

Closure

Although a small section was retained for the National Centre for Biosecurity, the main site closed in 2007; the majority of research functions being relocated. In 2014 the remainder of the site was sold to a private owner for property development. The campus buildings have been repurposed as a business park, while the farmland, which is known as Wallaceville Estate, is being turned into a residential subdivision with streets named after notable researchers at the Research Centre including Cyril Hopkirk and Dr Malcolm Buddle.

Notable employees
By 1907 over 85 acres had been cleared, 45 acres having been sown in permanent pasture, with hedging established and oats and other forage crops planted for animal feed.  With some foresight, specimen Totara trees were left and Elms and Oaks were planted along the road frontage, most of which still remain over 100 years later.

 Ira Cunningham
 John Filmer
 Cyril Hopkirk
 Sydney Josland

Education

It was founded in 1954.

It includes Titiro Whakamua, a specialist unit for teen parents.

See also 
 Upper Hutt Blockhouse

References

Further reading 
Tenquist, J.D. (1990). Wallaceville Veterinary Laboratory: An Anecdotal History. MAF Technology, Wallaceville Animal Research Centre. 

Suburbs of Upper Hutt